Little Seneca Creek is an  stream in Montgomery County, Maryland, roughly  northwest of Washington, D.C.

Geography
The creek drains portions of Clarksburg, Germantown, and Boyds.

A portion of the creek below the lake is a cold water stream that supports wild rainbow and brown trout populations.

The creek and reservoir are a drinking water source as part of the Little Seneca system, an emergency water supply for the metropolitan Washington, D.C. area.

Water quality issues
In 1994, the Montgomery County Council anticipated population growth in the Little Seneca watershed and imposed some restrictions on housing development and other new construction in part of the watershed, in order to preserve water quality before development accelerated.  A "Special Protection Area" was designated that requires additional controls for stormwater runoff, beyond those required of all new projects.

However, the county reported in 2010 that its recent requirements for new construction projects had not been sufficient to prevent water quality impairment. Several large land development projects were constructed in Clarksburg and elsewhere in the watershed over the past several years. The county conducted biological monitoring of stream conditions and documented declines in water quality associated with the new construction. More comprehensive site designs to minimize stormwater runoff, such as conservation design or low impact development designs, were recommended.

In 2014, the County Council set additional limits on development projects in order to protect the quality of the Tenmile Creek tributary and adjacent habitat.

Tributaries
Boyds Tributary
Brodsky Tributary
Bucklodge Branch
Cabin Branch
Churchill Tributary
Germantown Estates Tributary
Milestone Tributary
Tenmile Creek
Town Center Tributary

See also
List of Maryland rivers
Little Seneca Lake
Seneca Creek

References

External links 
Seneca Creek Watershed Partners - Volunteer stewardship organization
Whitewater Info for Little Seneca Creek - Riverfacts.com

Rivers of Montgomery County, Maryland
Rivers of Maryland
Tributaries of the Potomac River